Tama Maru (Japanese: 玉丸) was an auxiliary minesweeper of the Imperial Japanese Navy during World War II.

History
Tama Maru was laid down on 28 May 1936 at the shipyard of Mitsubishi Jukogyo Kobe Zosensho at the behest of shipping company, Taiyo Hogei.  She was launched on 5 August 1936 and completed 28 September 1936. She was the first of 8 ships built of her class (Tama Maru, Tama Maru No. 2, Tama Maru No. 3, Tama Maru No. 5,  Tama Maru No. 6, Tama Maru No. 7, Tama Maru No. 8, Tama Maru No. 9 (later Nagato Maru)). On 15 August 1941, she was requisitioned by the Imperial Japanese Navy and converted to an auxiliary minesweeper under Reserve Lieutenant Shiihara. 

She was assigned to the Port Moresby Operation (Operation MO) tasked with the occupation of the Australian Territory of New Guinea in order to isolate Australia and New Zealand from the United States. The operation was also to seize the islands of Tulagi and Samarai, and the Deboyne Islands (where seaplane bases were to be established) as well as Nauru and Banaba Island (due to their valuable phosphate deposits). The light carrier  provided air support accompanied by 4 cruisers and 1 destroyer. The force departed from Rabaul on 30 April 1942 and on 3 May 1942, landed on Tulagi unopposed. On 4 May 1942, Tama Maru was patrolling with Wa-1 and Wa-2 north of Savo Island when it was spotted by a squadron of Douglas TBD Devastators from the Yorktown. Wa-1 and Wa-2 were immediately sunk while Tama Maru was significantly damaged and sank on 6 May 1942.

She was struck from the Navy list on 25 May 1942.

References

1936 ships
Ships built by Mitsubishi Heavy Industries
Maritime incidents in May 1942
Minesweepers sunk by aircraft
World War II minesweepers of Japan
Mine warfare vessels of the Imperial Japanese Navy
Auxiliary ships of the Imperial Japanese Navy